Dreiburgensee is a lake in the Bavarian Forest, Bavaria, Germany. It lies at an elevation of 440 metres and has a surface area of 0.8 km².

Lakes of Bavaria
Reservoirs in Bavaria